Dungra is a census town in Banswara district  in the state of Rajasthan, India.

Demographics
 India census, Dungra had a population of 24,522. Males constitute 62% of the population and females 38%. Dungra has an average literacy rate of 73%, higher than the national average of 59.5%: male literacy is 80% and, female literacy is 63%. In Dungra, 16% of the population is under 6 years of age.

References

Cities and towns in Valsad district